RBDS Rubbish Boys Disposal Service Inc. (doing business as 1-800-GOT-JUNK?) is a Canadian franchised residential and commercial junk removal company operating in the United States, Canada, and Australia. The company's business model consists of taking junk or trash haulage, and giving it a "clean" image through branding and marketing.

History
The company started in Vancouver, British Columbia, Canada in 1989 by Brian Scudamore. He had the idea while he was in a McDonalds drive thru and saw a beat up old truck offering junk removal services in front of him, and he thought to himself, "I can do better than that". It was incorporated as The Rubbish Boys Disposal Service, then in 1998 with its current name.  The first permanent franchise opened in 1997 in Victoria, British Columbia, and a second in Toronto in 1998. In 2000, the first franchise opened outside Canada, in Portland, Oregon.

The chief operating officer is Erik Church.

Operations
1-800-GOT-JUNK? performs bi-annual audits of their environmental practices. The company claims to keep 63.5% of collected items out of the landfill by recycling and by donating to community and charity organizations. Franchisees have access to a report to track their landfill diversion.

1-800-GOT-JUNK? evaluates its level of customer service using the Net Promoter Score system. 1-800-GOT-JUNK? released a consumer-based mobile booking site in 2012 and a mobile app in 2013 for franchisees and their employees to manage operations.

In the media
Entrepreneur magazine named the company 425th of 500 franchises in 2013. Achievers, a company that offers social recognition and employee engagement solutions to its clients, rated the subject of this article Canada's "most engaged workplace" in 2013 and recognised it in 2012.

The company is a sponsor of and participates in episodes of the A&E series 'Hoarders'.

The founder and CEO is Brian Scudamore.

References

Canadian brands
Companies based in Vancouver
Canadian companies established in 1989
Waste companies established in 1989
1989 establishments in British Columbia
Multinational companies headquartered in Canada
Waste management companies of Canada
Waste management companies of the United States
Telephone numbers in Canada
Franchises
Telephone numbers in the United States